Mutawakilu Adam (born 2 March 1974) is a Ghanaian accountant and politician who is member of the Seventh Parliament of the Fourth Republic of Ghana representing the Damango Constituency in the Savanna Region on the ticket of the National Democratic Congress (NDC).

Early life and education 
Mutawakilu Adam comes from Damango in the Savanna Region. He is an Accountant and Financial Officer. He holds a teachers certificate A from Bagabaga Training College. He holds a bachelor's degree in Administration from University of Ghana in 2002, and Commonwealth Executive Master of Business Administration (CEMBA) from Kwame Nkrumah University of Science and Technology in 2010.

Career 
Mutawakilu was nominated by John Evans Atta Mills to serve as District Chief Executive for West Gonja District with its capital being Damango his hometown. Mutawakilu served as District Chief Executive (DCE) for West Gonja District between May 2009  to January 2013. As DCE he worked to improve the lives of the people within his communities with a key focus on education, water, sanitation and healthcare.

Prior to being appointed as DCE, Mutawakilu worked as a Chief Cashier and Head of Treasury from 2004 to 2009 at University for Development Studies, at the Central Administration in Tamale. He also worked as Class Tutor from 1996 to 2003 at Ghana Education Service.

Politics

Member of Parliament

2012 Elections 
He contested for the Damango constituency seat in the 2012 on the ticket of the National Democratic Congress and won by getting 9,518 votes representing 56.79% against  Albert Kassim Diwura his closest contender of New Patriotic Party's candidate who got 7,041 votes representing 42.01%. He served on the majority bench from 2013 to 2017 since his party had retained power in the elections through President John Dramani Mahama and had maintained their majority seats in parliament.

2016 Elections 
In 2016, Mutawakilu contested for re election for the Damango Constituency, he won the parliamentary elections by getting 10,263 votes which represented 55.22% against Albert Kassim Diwura, same candidate from the 2012 elections, who this time had 8,139 votes representing 43.79%. His party lost the general Presidential Elections to the New Patriotic Party and had lost their majority seats therefore this time around he was to serve on the minority bench of the parliament.

Mutawakilu Adam is a member of the Minority Bench of the 7th Parliament of the 4th Republic in Ghana. He is the Minority Spokesperson on Mines and Energy. He also served on the Members Holding Ofiices of Profit Committee.

Serving as the Ranking member on Mines and Energy Mutawakilu pushed to secure funding from the Ghana National Petroleum Corporation (GNPC) foundation for projects within his constituency. The projects to be put up included drilling of four mechanized boreholes, 12 hand pump boreholes and two 12 seater KVIPs in some selected communities as reported by the West Gonja District. In September 2020, He also presented an ambulance to the Busunu Health Centre in fulfillment of a promise he made to the chiefs and people, to help in the transportation of patients from the health care to the district hospital 

Mutawakilu in his capacity as ranking member on mines and energy called for the arrest of both Prof. Frimpong-Boateng, Minister of Science and Technology and Minister for Lands and Natural Resources regarding the scandals of the about 500 missing excavators which were seized from illegal miners by the task force Galamstop.

Personal life 
He is a Muslim, and married with 5 children.

References

Ghanaian MPs 2017–2021
1972 births
Living people
Ghanaian Muslims
National Democratic Congress (Ghana) politicians
Ghanaian MPs 2013–2017
Ghanaian accountants
Academic staff of the University for Development Studies